The Attorney General of Mozambique (Procurador Geral da Republica) is the chief law officer in the Republic of Mozambique. The Attorney General is appointed by the President of Mozambique for a period of five years.

List of attorneys general
 Eduardo Mulembwe, Attorney General from late 1980s to 1994? (Certainly Attorney General in 1992.)
 Sinai Nhatitima, 1994–1997.
 Antonio Namburete, 1997–2000
 Joaquim Madeira, 2000–2007.
 Augusto Paulino, 2007–2014.
 Beatriz Buchili, 2014–present.

References

Law of Mozambique
Attorneys general